Witte's worm lizard (Monopeltis remaclei) is a species of amphisbaenian in the family Amphisbaenidae. The species is endemic to the Democratic Republic of the Congo.

Etymology
The specific name, remaclei, is in honor of David L. Remacle who collected the holotype.

Reproduction
The mode of reproduction of M. remaclei is unknown.

References

Further reading
Gans C (2005). "Checklist and Bibliography of the Amphisbaenia of the World". Bulletin of the American Museum of Natural History (289): 1–130. (Monopeltis remaclei, p. 37).
de Witte G-F (1933). "Description de deux amphisbaenides du Congo Belge ". Revue de Zoologie Africaine 23 (2): 168–171. (Monopeltis remaclei, new species). (in French).
de Witte G-F, Laurent RF (1942). "Contribution à la systématique de Amphisbaenidae du Congo belge ". Revue de Zoologie et de Botanique Africaines 36 (1): 67–86. (in French).

Monopeltis
Endemic fauna of the Democratic Republic of the Congo
Reptiles of the Democratic Republic of the Congo
Reptiles described in 1933
Taxa named by Gaston-François de Witte